Bieldside railway station served the Bieldside area within the parish of Peterculter from 1897 to 1937 on the Deeside Railway that ran from Aberdeen (Joint) to Ballater. This area was the location of a number of mansion houses and estates such as Woodthorpe, Dalmunzie, The Firs, etc., some built as a result of the railway.

History 
The station was opened in June 1897 as part of the Aberdeen suburban service on the Deeside branch and at first branch services were operated by the Deeside Railway. Later the line became part of the GNoSR who opened Bieldside and at grouping merged with the London and North Eastern Railway. Bieldside is likely to have become an unstaffed halt circa 1930 and was closed to passengers on 5 April 1937 as a part of the withdrawal of the Aberdeen suburban service. The station probably became unstaffed at the same time as Murtle and Milltimber with the aforementioned closure of the Aberdeen suburban service. After its closure in 1937 the line itself remained open to Ballater until 1966. The line has been lifted and this section forms part of the Deeside Way long-distance footpath.

Infrastructure

The wooden station building with its 'hipped roof', had a waiting room, ticket office, staff accommodation and toilets, similar to those at Torphins, Lumphanan and elsewhere on the line. It did not possess a goods yard.

The decision to construct the station was made on 11 January 1893 and it opened in 1897 at a cost of £1363. The line was doubled in 1892, a stone stationmasters house built, together with a wooden pedestrian overbridge and a signal box with a small wooden shelter located on the westbound platform. No points were present on this curved section of track.

In 1963 the station, closed since 1937, was now on a single track section of line with the station house still standing however the old station building and signal box had been demolished by this date. The westbound side of the track was the first to be lifted.

Services
In 1928 the suburban railway, locally called the 'subbies' started additionally operating Sunday services to Culter however due to competition with the buses it was announced on 28 January 1937 that the service would cease altogether in April 1937, Sunday services having ceased in 1936.

The site today 
Both platforms of Aberdeenshire granite remaining in situ however the station buildings apart from the stationmaster's have been demolished. The Royal Deeside Railway is located at Milton of Crathes some distance down the line towards Ballater.

References

Sources
 
 Maxtone, Graham and Cooper, Mike (2018). Then and Now on the Great North. V.1. GNoSR Association. .

External links
Film of the station and the Deeside line.

Disused railway stations in Aberdeenshire
Former Great North of Scotland Railway stations
Railway stations in Great Britain opened in 1897
Railway stations in Great Britain closed in 1937